Gentiana olivieri (Chinese: xie wan que qin jiao) is a plant species in the genus Gentiana found in Asia.

Bioassay-directed fractionation techniques led to isolation of isoorientin as the main hypoglycemic component in G. olivieri.

References

External links

olivieri
Flora of China
Plants described in 1838